Siobhán McSweeney (born 27 December 1979) is an Irish actress and presenter. She is best known for her role as Sister Michael in the teen sitcom Derry Girls.

Early life
McSweeney was born in County Cork, Ireland where she grew up in Aherla. Before acting, she earned a science degree at the University College Cork. In 2001, she moved to London when she secured a place at the Central School of Speech and Drama.

Career
McSweeney's first role was in 2006 as Julia in the film The Wind That Shakes the Barley. In 2015, she played Una Gilbert in the film Mr. Holmes. The same year, she played Ruth Cheetham in No Offence. In 2016, she played Audrey in As You Like It at National Theatre Live. Later that year, she played the role of Witzender in the film Alice Through the Looking Glass. In 2017, she played a social worker in the short film Big Dog.

From 2018 to 2022, McSweeney played the role of Sister Michael in the Channel 4 sitcom Derry Girls written by Lisa McGee. McSweeney also played Petra in three episodes of Collateral. In 2019, McSweeney played the role of Boring Noreen in the film Extra Ordinary. She also played Alice the television series Porters on Dave. In 2020, she appeared in the short films The Widow and Scrubber.

Outside acting, McSweeney has also made guest appearances on television shows including Sunday Brunch and Front Row Late. She also appeared on the Derry Girls edition of The Great British Bake Off which aired on 1 January 2020. Since January 2021, she has been the presenter on The Great Pottery Throw Down on Channel 4. She did not appear in the initial episodes of the 2022 series, after breaking her leg in two places. Ellie Taylor stood in for her. 
In 2023, she appeared in a celebrity episode of Catchphrase winning almost £30,000 for her charity, The Maya Centre in North London.

Personal life
On 8 November 2019, McSweeney's flat in London caught fire due to a cube double adaptor that had fallen out of the socket. McSweeney was out at the time but revealed she had developed anxiety
following the incident.

Filmography

References

External links

Irish television actresses
Living people
People from County Cork
1979 births